Northfield Town Football Club is an amateur football club based in the Selly Oak area in the South of the City of Birmingham, England. The senior first team play in the Birmingham and District Football League, the over 35s play in the Central Warwickshire Over 35's Football League, the overs 50s team play in the Worcestershire Over 50s League  and the youth and junior teams play in the Central Warwickshire Youth Football League and the Midland Junior Premier League.

History

Although Northfield Town F.C. came into being in 1966, its origins go back to the early 1950s. After spells in the Kings Norton League, Warwickshire & West Midlands Alliance and the Mercian League, they joined the Combination in 1957 (then the Worcestershire Combination). Playing under the name of Allen's Cross they won the League Challenge Cup in their first year and the League Championship in 1961–62. Following amalgamation with another successful local side, Castle Rovers, the club played briefly as Cross Castle United before adopting the present title of Northfield Town.

In 2013 Northfield Town F.C. amalgamated with Shenley Radford Youth F.C. to create a youth system. This was the beginning of Northfield Town Juniors F.C., with the teams competing in the Central Warwickshire Youth Football League.

The 2013-14 season was the last season in the Midland Football Combination, in which Northfield Town finished 13th before entering the newly formed Midland Football League for the 2014-15 season. For the 2021-22 season the club went through some major changes and made the decision to join the Birmingham and District Football League, with the hope this will help the clubs growth in the long term.

During the 2016/17 the club twice broke its record for largest attendance, firstly Vs Paget Rangers, when 101 people attended the game, and then again on the last league game of the season Vs Montpellier with an attendance of 124 people.

Club badge and colours 

Northfield Town F.C's club badge is based on the how the club came to be, with the original amalgamations of 2 local sides back in 1966. The red cross represents Allen's Cross F.C. and the castle represents Castle Rovers F.C.

The club colours changed in 2013 due to the amalgamation with Shenley Radford Youth F.C. The home kits are Black and White vertical stripes with a hint of red in the shirts (Shenley Radford's traditional colours), the away kit is Blue and Yellow (Northfield Town's traditional colours) 

For the 2016/17 season and to celebrate 50 years of the club, the senior first team wore the Blue and Yellow kit at home, in honour to the milestone and the clubs history, with the black and white strip being used as an away kit.

Ground

The home games for both Northfield Town F.C and Northfield Town Junior F.C are played at Shenley Community Association and Sports Centre, based in the Selly Oak area of Birmingham.

The present sports ground was initially the playing fields for The Allens Cross Community Association and they remained the "parent body" until 1983.

The field was opened in 1935; that year King George V and Queen Mary were celebrating the Silver Jubilee of their reign to mark the event a fund was set up, called the King George V Playing Fields Fund. At Allen's Cross funds were also obtained from the Birmingham Branch of the National Playing Fields Association, the Birmingham Civic Society, Bournville Village Trust and other donors.

Eventually, in 1937, work started on a clubhouse pavilion, provided by the Feeney Trust, tarmac tennis court and caretaker's house, all of which were officially opened on 27 August 1938 by George Cadbury. The ground itself was laid out for two football pitches and one cricket pitch.

When Cadburys formed a partnership with Schweppes in the early 1970s, three of their properties, the Allens Cross Sports ground, Weoley Hill Cricket and Tennis Club and the Cadbury Club in Bournville Lane, were allowed to have a bar. The sports club then went from strength to strength while the Community Hall was struggling and in the red.

In 1983 the committee from the sports ground requested to break away from Allens Cross Community Association.  Discussions took place and Chris Cadbury, President of the Association, reluctantly agreed on the understanding that they became a Community Association. With that, the sports ground "broke" from the "parent body", Allen's Cross. It became a registered charity in its own right and was renamed Shenley Lane Community Association & Sports Centre. It originally comprised Northfield Town F.C, Allens Cross Cricket and Shenley Radford Youth Club.

From this time cricket was the longest surviving sports group at the ground. Allen's Cross Cricket Club ran from 1938 to 2002. In the latter years they survived by recruiting many immigrant cricketers of considerable ability, but these had no permanent connection with the association and the club folded completely in 2002. Cricket is still played regularly at Shenley Lane by a number of local clubs.

At the same time a development plan was put into place and with the help of the Prince's Trust a brand new changing block, entrance, stand and toilets were added. Later an all-weather pitch was built.

Various developments have taken place over recent years, most significantly the security fencing, but are usually limited to "refurbishments" due to limited funds.

Honours
Seniors
Midland Football League Division 2
 Champions 2019-20
 Midland Football League Division 3
 Promotion 2016-17
Birmingham & District Football League Division 2
Champions 2021-22
Birmingham & District Football League Senior Cup
Runners-up 2021-22
Birmingham & District Football League Intermediate Cup
Champions 2021-22

Midland Football Combination Premier Division
Champions 1975–76, 1994–95
Runners-up 1989–90
Midland Football Combination Division One
Champions 1998–99
Runner-up 2005–06
Midland Football Combination Challenge Cup
Winners 1983–84, 1988–89
Midland Football Combination Presidents Cup
Winners 1980–81
Birmingham Senior Amateur Cup
Winners 1974–75
Birmingham County Saturday Challenge Vase 
Winners 2007-08, 2017-2018
Lord Mayor of Birmingham Charity Cup
Runners-up 1990-91, 1992-93
Tony Alden Memorial Cup
Winners 1976-77
Smedley Crooke Cup
Winners 1989-90
Runners-up 4 times

Juniors

 Birmingham County Youth Cup (Saturday & Sunday combined)
Winners 1969-70, 1970-71, 1971-72, 1976-77, 1977-78, 1987-88
Runners Up 1972-73, 1981-82, 1982-83, 1985-86

 Birmingham County Minor Cup (U16s)
Winners 1993-94, 1999-00, 2013-14
Runners-up 1998-99, 2001-02, 2008-09, 2012-13
Worcestershire County Youth Cup winners
4 times
Birmingham A.F.A Youth Cup winners
Winners 1989-90, 1990-91, 1991-92, 1993-94 
Runners-up 1988-89, 1992-93
Mercian A.F.A. Premier Championship
1982/83
Mercian A.F.A. Division One Champions
1973/74
Mercian A.F.A. Senior Cup
1979/80
Aston Villa Shield
Winners 1973-74, 1979-80
Queens Hospital Cup
Winners 1985-86

Records

FA Vase
3rd Round 1988-89
Record Attendance 
2016-17 season, 01/05/2017, Vs Montpellier - 124
Birmingham Youth Cup (Saturday & Sunday Combined)
Most times winners - 6
Most final appearances - 10

References

External links

Midland Football Combination Division One clubs
 Midland Football League 2014/15 Division Three

Football clubs in the West Midlands (county)
Association football clubs established in 1966
Sport in Birmingham, West Midlands
Football clubs in Birmingham, West Midlands
1966 establishments in England
Midland Football Combination
Midland Football League
Football clubs in England